The 1984–85 Louisville Cardinals men's basketball team represented the University of Louisville in NCAA Division I men's competition in the 1984–85 season. Coached by Denny Crum, the Cardinals appeared in the semifinals of the 1985 National Invitation Tournament. The Cardinals lost to the UCLA team, the eventual NIT champions. The Cardinals played their home games at Freedom Hall.

National Invitation Tournament
First Round
Louisville 77, Alcorn State 75
Second Round
Louisville 68, South Florida 61
Quarterfinal
Louisville 71, Tennessee-Chattanooga 66
Seminfinal
UCLA 75, Louisville 66

References

Louisville Cardinals men's basketball seasons
Louisville
Louisville
Louisville Cardinals men's basketball, 1984-85
Louisville Cardinals men's basketball, 1984-85